Lucy Nettie Fletcher (February 18, 1886 – May 6, 1918) was a British-born American nurse who died while on active duty in France during World War I.

Biography
Fletcher was born in Grouville, Isle of Jersey, England, February 18, 1886. She was the daughter of Charles George Ellis and Nettie Murdock (Binet) Fletcher, and the granddaughter of Rev. William and Lucy Antoinette (Murdock) Binet. Fletcher's father and grandfather were English, but on her mother's side, she was descended from Massachusetts families, Mason, Dedham, and Robert Murdock, who emigrated to Roxbury, Massachusetts, in 1692. She had a brother, Vivian F. Fletcher, and three sisters.

In 1902, she came to Concord, New Hampshire, to make her home with her aunts, the Misses Eliza M., Alice L., and Maude B. Binet. 

She was educated at St. Mary's School (now White Mountain School) one year; high school, 1902; and graduated from Radcliffe College, A.B., 1910. Fletcher began training as a secretary in the Associated Charities of Boston. She graduated from the nursing school at Massachusetts General Hospital, February 1916, and became night supervisor in that hospital. She was a member of the Boston Woman's College Club, St. Mary's Alumnae Association, and Radcliffe Alumnae Association. In religion, she was Episcopalian.  

In June 1917, she left for France with the U.S. Army Base Hospital, No. 6, to which she belonged, joining the front in July of that year. She became head nurse in one of the medical wards.

Death and legacy
Fletcher contracted meningitis and died May 6, 1918. She was buried with full military honors in the first grave in the officers' cemetery. She was the first Red Cross nurse in General Pershing's army to die in the performance of duty. Fletcher's name, along with that of two other Radcliffe alumni, is inscribed on a tablet at Memorial Church of Harvard University.

References

Attribution

Bibliography
 

1886 births
1918 deaths
American Red Cross personnel
American women nurses
Civilians killed in World War I
Nurses killed in World War I
Female nurses in World War I
Nurses from Massachusetts
Deaths from meningitis
Neurological disease deaths in France
Infectious disease deaths in France
Radcliffe College alumni
Massachusetts General Hospital people
British emigrants to the United States